Müllerian may refer to:

Müllerian mimicry, a type of mimicry or convergence named after Fritz Müller
Müllerian ducts, which enter the cloaca of an embryo (named after Johannes Peter Müller)
 Mullerian anomalies are structural anomalies caused by errors in embryonic müllerian duct development
Mixed Müllerian tumor